Shamsabad (also Romanized as Shamsābād) is a village in Arzuiyeh Rural District, in the Central District of Arzuiyeh County, Kerman Province, Iran. At the 2006 census, its population was 24, in 4 families.

References 

Populated places in Arzuiyeh County